Hypodoxa bryophylla, the green looper moth, is a moth of the family Geometridae. The species was first described by Gilbert M. Goldfinch in 1929. It is found in the Australian states of Victoria, New South Wales and Queensland.

The wingspan is about 30 mm. Adults are green, with reddish-brown markings, and black zigzag lines across each wing.

The larvae feed on the foliage of Eucalyptus and Angophora species, as well as Acacia falcata, Acacia leiocalyx and Acacia pycnantha. They are thin and green, with a red and white line along each side of the body. The larva may reach a length of about 50 mm. Pupation takes place in a loose cocoon within joined curled leaves of the food plant.

See also
 List of moths of Australia
 https://www.csiro.au/en/Research/Collections/ANIC/ID-Resources/Australian-Moths-Online

References

Moths described in 1929
Pseudoterpnini